"The Sound of Crying" is a single by English pop band Prefab Sprout, released by Kitchenware Records in June 1992. It was one of two new songs included on their compilation album A Life of Surprises: The Best of Prefab Sprout. It was one of the band's biggest hits, reaching No. 23 on the UK Singles Chart.

Composition
Paddy McAloon originally wrote the song in April 1990 for a proposed biographical album about Michael Jackson, whom he was fascinated by. The verses originally listed unhappy things that had happened to Jackson, while the original lyrics of the chorus were "Only the boogie music / Will never, ever let you down". The song's final form has been described by McAloon as "a “Why does God allow this?” song". The lyrics concern the plights of people around the world, and ask why they cannot be helped. This was prompted by George H. W. Bush's references to a new world order, as McAloon felt that "no matter how well-regulated you make the world, no matter how well-regulated our affairs are, disasters are kind of there".

Release
The song received significant airplay on BBC Radio 1, and became Prefab Sprout's first top 30 hit on the UK singles chart since "The King of Rock 'n' Roll" reached No. 7 four years earlier. It peaked at No. 23, and remains the band's second highest-charting single to date. A music video featuring the band was produced and was included on the VHS release "A Life of Surprises: The Video Collection".

Reception
The song was well received, with Jim Lawn of the Lennox Herald calling it "Paddy McAloon's best chance of a hit single in ages".
The Times Alan Jackson commented that the song's "lush production and glorious melody" were used "to sneak one of the oldest debates in Christendom before millions of Radio 1 listeners". Similarly, David Cavanagh of Select praised how the song "manages to include ice-cool phraseology like “the music of the spheres” while still being catchy enough to be this week’s third most played single on Radio 1".

Track listings

7"Side 1 "The Sound Of Crying (Edit)"Side 2'
 "The Sound Of Crying (Full Version)"

CD
 "The Sound Of Crying (Edit)
 "The Sound Of Crying (Full Version)"
 "Looking For Atlantis"
 "The Golden Calf"

References

External links

Prefab Sprout songs
1992 singles
1992 songs
Songs written by Paddy McAloon